Deuce is the third studio album by Dallas rapper The D.O.C., and the second since the car accident which severely damaged his larynx.  The only single released from Deuce was "The Shit", which features former-N.W.A. members MC Ren and Ice Cube, along with Snoop Dogg and 6Two.

Production
The album was originally meant to be a 6Two album, completely produced by Dr. Dre and released through Aftermath Entertainment. However, D.O.C. and Dre argued over whether D.O.C. should be rapping on the album. The D.O.C.'s presence on this album is minimal however, making an appearance to introduce tracks or perform in skits such as "My Prayer" and "Souliloquy". Deuce focuses primarily on showcasing other artists on D.O.C.'s Silverback Records label, including U.P.-T.I.G.H.T., El Dorado, and in particular, 6Two.

The song "Simple as That" was released earlier in 2003 on DJ Greg Street's Six O'Clock Vol. 1 mixtape.

Track listing

Singles

"The Shit"

"The Shit" (censored as "The ?hit") is the only single from The D.O.C.'s 2003 album Deuce. A posse cut, the song features former-N.W.A. members MC Ren and Ice Cube along with Snoop Dogg and 6Two. "The Shit" was released in 2003 on CD and 12-inch vinyl formats but did not appear on any music chart. The 12-inch promotional release includes the track "Big Dick Shit (Concrete Jungle)" as a B-side; produced by Jazze Pha, the song features Nate Dogg, U.P.-T.I.G.H.T., and 6Two. "The Shit" contains samples of 
"P. Funk (Wants to Get Funked Up)" by Parliament and "Still Talkin'" by Eazy-E.

US vinyl track listing
A side
 The Shit (Street) - 4:59
 The Shit (Clean) - 4:01

B side
 The Shit (Instrumental) - 5:08
 The Shit (A Cappella) - 4:58

US promotional vinyl track listing
A side
 The Shit (Clean) - 4:01
 The Shit (Street) - 4:59
 The Shit (Instrumental) - 5:08
 The Shit (A Cappella) - 4:58

B side
 Big Dick Shit (Clean) - 4:07
 Big Dick Shit (Street) - 4:06
 Big Dick Shit (Instrumental) - 3:57
 Big Dick Shit (A Cappella)

References

2003 albums
The D.O.C. albums
Albums produced by Dr. Dre
Albums produced by Jazze Pha